Corazón de fiera is a 1951 Mexican film that was produced by Fernando de Fuentes.

External links
 

1951 films
1950s Spanish-language films
Mexican crime drama films
1951 crime drama films
Mexican black-and-white films
1950s Mexican films